{{Album ratings
|rev1 = BBC
|rev1score = (?)
|rev2 = In The News
|rev2Score = (6/10)<ref name="Bardsley">Bardsley, Bob. [http://www.inthenews.co.uk/reviews/music/r-n-b-rap/esmee-denters-outta-here-$1352595.htm~ In The News Review: "Outta Here (album)|Outta Here]. Retrieved 2010-01-08.</ref>
}}Outta Here is the debut studio album by Dutch pop artist and songwriter Esmée Denters. It was released on Tennman Records in May and June 2009 in Europe, and was released in the UK on 11 January 2010. Production was handled mostly and executively by Justin Timberlake with Denters herself co-writing the album.

The album was preceded by the release of the title track "Outta Here" as the first single. The song was released in April 2009, reaching top ten in the Netherlands and the UK, number 12 in New Zealand, and number 26 in Belgium.  After the album's release, "Admit It" was released as the second single on 4 September 2009 and peaked at 28 in the Netherlands.

Background
In the summer of 2007, Timberlake and Denters began writing and producing songs for her debut album.

In April 2009, Denters confirmed on Dutch radio station Radio 538 that her debut album, Outta Here, would be released on 22 May 2009, also confirming that the album is a mix of pop and R&B with both ballads, and uptempo tracks.

Speaking in October 2009, Esmée explained to noted UK R&B writer Pete Lewis of the award-winning Blues & Soul her reasons for naming her debut album after her debut single: "I called it 'Outta Here' because to me that one song in itself actually encapsulates what the album in its entirety is about. You know, it's a pop song, it has a bit of an R&B feel, it has some rock in it, a little bit of dance... So, because I thought that mixture of styles was just so representative of the record as a whole, I decided to name the album after it."

Singles
"Outta Here" is the first official single from the album and was produced by Polow Da Don and Justin Timberlake. On 13 May, the video was released. It was made available for download on 14 May 2009. According to British newspaper The Sun'', the song released on 14 August 2009 in the UK with the album following soon after.
"Admit It" is the second single and was released on 4 September 2009 and was written/produced by Timberlake and Toby Gad. The Music Video premiered on 3 September on Dutch Music Channel TMF.
"Love Dealer" is the third and final single. On 22 March, the British radio station BBC Radio 1Xtra confirmed that Love Dealer will be the next single of Esmée Denters. Justin Timberlake has featured vocals on the song and will appear in the video. It's set to be the first single to be released in Australia.

Track listing

Outtakes
"007 On You" (Denters, Stefani Germanotta, RedOne)
"Head Start" (Denters, Timberlake, Hannon Lane)

Charts

Weekly charts

Year-end charts

Release history

References

2009 debut albums
Esmée Denters albums
Albums produced by Danja (record producer)
Albums produced by Justin Timberlake
Albums produced by Mike Elizondo
Albums produced by Polow da Don
Albums produced by Ryan Tedder
Albums produced by Stargate
Albums produced by Toby Gad
Interscope Records albums
Albums produced by Mark Taylor (music producer)
European Border Breakers Award-winning albums